1400s may refer to:
 The century from 1400 to 1499, almost synonymous with the 15th century (1401–1500)
 1400s (decade), the period from 1400 to 1409